Baruch Padeh Medical Center (Beit Holim Barukh Padeh), also known as  Poriya Medical Center, is a general hospital located just south of Tiberias, in the Galilee region of Israel.

History
Poriya Medical Center was founded in 1955, replacing Schweitzer Hospital. The center incorporates a maternity hospital owned by the Scottish Church that was previously located in Tiberias. In 2005, the center was renamed for Prof. Baruch Padeh, former director-general of the Ministry of Health, who headed the hospital in 1974–1976. Located on Poriya Ridge above Tiberias, it serves the population of Tiberias, Golan Heights, Jordan Valley, Lower Galilee, kibbutzim and moshavim.

See also
Health care in Israel

References

External links 
 Baruch Padeh Medical Center (in hebrew)

Hospitals in Israel
1955 establishments in Israel